Patti McGee (born August 23, 1945) is a former professional skateboarder. She was the 1964 Women's first National Skateboard Champion, Santa Monica.

Her first skateboard was built by her brother in wood shop from her own shoe skate as a surprise.  Her second skateboard was a BunBuster.

While on the Cooley Team, and standing on a BunBuster, McGee set the world record for the fastest girl on a skateboard at 47 mph during Dick Clark's World Teen Fair 1964 held at the Orange County (CA) Fair Grounds.

McGee was also the first female professional skateboarder. She was paid by Hobie/Vita Pak to travel and demonstrate the Hobie skateboard on a national level. This lasted almost a year until the craze subsided. Patti McGee married Glenn Villa and then gave birth to 2 children, Forest and Hailey Villa. 
During the tour, McGee appeared on the occupation-guessing TV game show What's My Line? on May 16, 1965, without a skateboard (but did not stump the panel), and with a skateboard on The Johnny Carson Show the following evening. McGee was featured on the cover of Life magazine May 14, 1965 and the cover of the fourth issue of Skateboarder in October 1965.

In 2010, McGee was the first woman inducted into the Skateboarding Hall of Fame at IASC's (International Association of Skateboard Companies) Second Annual Skateboarding Hall of Fame Induction Ceremony.

References 

Female skateboarders
1945 births
Living people
American skateboarders